Canby is a surname. Notable people with the surname include:

Edward Canby (1817–1873), American general
Henry Seidel Canby (1878–1961), critic, editor, and Yale University professor
James Canby (1781–1858), businessman and banker based in Wilmington, Delaware
Louisa Hawkins Canby (1818–1889), wife of Edward Canby
Richard S. Canby (1808–1895), U.S. Representative from Ohio
Vincent Canby (1924–2000), film critic
William C. Canby Jr. (born 1931), U.S. Court of Appeals senior judge
William Marriott Canby (1831–1904), American financier and botanist